Hungana is an endangered Bantu language of the Democratic Republic of the Congo.

References

Yaka languages
Languages of the Democratic Republic of the Congo